Martin Hejlsberg (born 26 July 1963) is a Danish sailor. He competed in the Star event at the 1996 Summer Olympics.

References

External links
 

1963 births
Living people
Danish male sailors (sport)
Olympic sailors of Denmark
Sailors at the 1996 Summer Olympics – Star
Place of birth missing (living people)